is a Japanese former football player. His younger brother Tetsuya is also a footballer.

Playing career
Kijima was born in Mobara on 29 May 1979. After graduating from high school, he joined J1 League club Yokohama Marinos in 1998. On 7 November, he debuted against Nagoya Grampus Eight. However he could hardly play in the match until 1999. He also moved to Argentine club Defensores Belgrano in 1999. From late 2000, he played many matches as left side midfielder and forward. In September 2002, he moved to J2 League club Oita Trinita. He played many matches as substitute forward and the club won the champions in 2002 and was promoted to J1 from 2003. However he was released from the club end of 2002 season. After 9 months blank, he joined Oita Trinita again in October 2003. In 2006, he move to J2 club Tokyo Verdy. However he could not play at all in the match for injuries and left the club end of 2006 season. After 7 months blank, he joined Tokyo Verdy again in August 2007. However he could not play at all in the match. In 2008, he moved to newly was promoted to J2 League club, Roasso Kumamoto. 

He played many matches and scored 17 goals in 2 seasons. In 2010, he moved to Japan Football League (JFL) club FC Machida Zelvia. He played as regular player and scored 16 goals. In 2011, he moved to JFL club Matsumoto Yamaga FC. He played many matches with his younger brother Tetsuya and the club was promoted to J2 from 2012. In August 2012, he moved to Tokyo Verdy. In 2013, he moved to JFL club Kamatamare Sanuki. He played as regular player and the club was promoted to J2 from 2014. His brother Tetsuya also joined the club in 2015 and played together until end of 2017 season. In 2018, he moved to JFL club Maruyasu Okazaki. After one season at Maruyasu Okazaki, Kijima re-joined newly was relegated to J3 League club, Kamatamare Sanuki. He retired in December 2019.

Club statistics
.

References

External links

1979 births
Living people
People from Mobara
Association football people from Chiba Prefecture
Japanese footballers
J1 League players
J2 League players
J3 League players
Japan Football League players
Yokohama F. Marinos players
Defensores de Belgrano footballers
Oita Trinita players
Tokyo Verdy players
Roasso Kumamoto players
FC Machida Zelvia players
Matsumoto Yamaga FC players
Kamatamare Sanuki players
FC Maruyasu Okazaki players
Japanese expatriate footballers
Association football forwards